
Gmina Czernichów is a rural gmina (administrative district) in Żywiec County, Silesian Voivodeship, in southern Poland.

Villages
Gmina Czernichów contains the villages and settlements of Czernichów, Międzybrodzie Bialskie, Międzybrodzie Żywieckie and Tresna.

Neighbouring gminas
Gmina Czernichów is bordered by the towns of Bielsko-Biała and Żywiec, and by the gminas of Kozy, Łękawica, Łodygowice, Porąbka and Wilkowice.

Twin towns – sister cities

Gmina Czernichów is twinned with:
 Costa di Rovigo, Italy
 Neuvy, France

References

Czernichow
Żywiec County